Johann Burger (born 31 May 1829 – 2 May 1912) was a Swiss engraver.

Biography
Burger was born in Burg, Aargau. He was a pupil of landscape painter and engraver Jakob Suter at Zofingen, and from 1850 to 1856 of reproduction engraver Julius Thäter at the Munich Academy, and engraved as his first plate "The Stoning of Saint Stephen", after Schraudolph. His further works include "Lady Macbeth" (1858), after Cornelius; three plates illustrating scenes from the life of Saint Boniface, after Hess; and "Aurora" (1887), after Guido Reni. 

He died in Munich.

References

Further reading
 "Burger (2), Johann". In: Meyers Konversations-Lexikon. 4th edition. Band 3, Verlag des Bibliographischen Instituts, Leipzig/Wien 1885–1892, p.7 655 9online version)
 "Burger, Johann". In: Brockhaus Konversations-Lexikon 1894–1896, Band 3, p. 756 (online version)
 Walther Merz: "Burger, Johannes". In: Carl Brun (ed.): Schweizerisches Künstlerlexikon. Huber, Frauenfeld 1905, pp. 241–242 (online version)
 Hans Vollmer: "Burger, Johannes". In: Ulrich Thieme (ed.): Allgemeines Lexikon der Bildenden Künstler von der Antike bis zur Gegenwart. Begründet von Ulrich Thieme und Felix Becker. Band 5: Brewer–Carlingen. E. A. Seemann, Leipzig 1911, p. 246 (online version)
 Hyacinth Holland: "Johannes Burger". In: Christliche Kunst. München 1912, pp. 290–291 (online version)

External links

People from Kulm District
1829 births
1912 deaths
19th-century engravers
20th-century engravers
Swiss engravers